Princess Charoenkamala Suksavati or Phra Chao Boromwongse Ther Phra Ong Chao Charoenkamala Suksavati (23 March 1868 - 7 October 1874) was a Princess of Siam (later Thailand). She was a member of the Siamese royal family and was a daughter of King Mongkut (Rama IV) of Siam and Chao Chom Manda Huang.

References 

1868 births
1874 deaths
19th-century Thai royalty who died as children
19th-century Chakri dynasty
Thai female Phra Ong Chao
Children of Mongkut
People from Bangkok
Daughters of kings